Dereham Neatherd High School is a high school situated in Dereham, Norfolk,  England. It is a co-educational comprehensive school, for ages 11–16.

History
The school was formerly the Dereham High School for Girls, opening in 1912. The first headteacher was Alexandra Fisher, with the first pupil entered onto the roll on 25 January 1912.

The school was named in July 2019 as a computing hub for the National Centre for Computing Education.

The school used to be twinned with Dereham Sixth Form College.

Centenary

British Rail Class 37 diesel locomotive 37003, based on the Mid-Norfolk Railway, was named 'Dereham Neatherd High School 1912-2012' as part of the celebrations of the centenary of the school. The  Mid-Norfolk Railway runs from Dereham to Wymondham.

References

External links

Dereham
Secondary schools in Norfolk
Academies in Norfolk
Educational institutions established in 1912
1912 establishments in England